Yee Seu Kai is a Malaysian politician from DAP. He was the Member of Perak State Legislative Assembly for Pokok Assam from 2008 to 2013.

Politics 
He wanted to quit politics before the 2013 Malaysian general election, thus the DAP Perak state chairman, Nga Kor Ming had arranged his special assistant, Teh Kok Lim to replace him to defend the seat.

Election result

References 

Democratic Action Party (Malaysia) politicians
Members of the Perak State Legislative Assembly
Malaysian people of Chinese descent
Malaysian politicians of Chinese descent
Living people
Year of birth missing (living people)